Lurand is an unincorporated community located on U.S. Route 49 in Coahoma County, Mississippi, United States.

References

Unincorporated communities in Coahoma County, Mississippi
Unincorporated communities in Mississippi